Pro Evolution Soccer 2013 (PES 2013, known as World Soccer: Winning Eleven 2013 in Japan and South Korea) is an association football video game, developed and published by Konami. The game was announced by Konami on April 18, 2012. For the first time of the series, all 20 teams from the Brazilian national league, Campeonato Brasileiro Serie A, are included in the game series. The UEFA Champions League and UEFA Europa League features in the game. PES 2013 was the last game in the series available on a Nintendo home console and was succeeded by Pro Evolution Soccer 2014.

Release
The demo version was released on 25 July 2012, followed by the retail version on 20 September 2012 in Australia, on 21 September 2012 in Europe, and in North America on 25 September 2012. Cristiano Ronaldo from Real Madrid is featured for the front cover. Also in Japanese Version, Japanese player Shinji Kagawa which his club is Manchester United was featured again in cover art.

The New Data Pack 6.00 was released on 7 March 2013 which includes all the January transfers.

Reception

Pro Evolution Soccer 2013 was met with generally positive reception. GameRankings and Metacritic gave it a score of 81.55% and 82 out of 100 for the PlayStation 3 version; 80.43% and 82 out of 100 for the Xbox 360 version; 72.50% and 80 out of 100 for the PC version; and 55% and 60 out of 100 for the Wii version.

It is often considered by fans of the franchise to be the best game in the series. The Digital Fix gave the PS3 version a score of nine out of ten, stating, "It might have taken a very long time but PES is finally good again." Digital Spy gave the same version four stars out of five and said, "When the whistle blows and the action is go, PES 2013 is easily a match for FIFA, coming closer than ever to winning back its crown." Neil Davey of The Guardian also gave it four stars out of five, stating: "Is this the Pro Evo to convince Fifa [sic] fans to switch? No. Is it an improvement on the last couple of years' PES incarnations? Yes. Will I be loving it and hating it and still playing it until PES 2014 comes out? Absolutely." The Daily Telegraph gave the Xbox 360 version four stars out of five and called it "[a]n excellent and long overdue return to form."

The game sold 399,340 copies in Japan in 2012.

References

External links
 
 Konami official website

2012 video games
Games for Windows certified games
IOS games
Nintendo 3DS games
Nintendo 3DS eShop games
Nintendo Wi-Fi Connection games
Nintendo Network games
PlayStation 2 games
PlayStation 3 games
PlayStation Portable games
2013
Wii games
Wii Wi-Fi games
Windows games
Xbox 360 games
Video games developed in Japan
La Liga licensed video games
Sports video games with career mode
Multiplayer and single-player video games